Qarah Su or Qareh Su may refer to:
Qareh Su, Gilan
Qareh Su, Golestan
Qarah Su, Lorestan
Qarah Su, Qom
Qarah Su, Razavi Khorasan
Qarah Su Rural District (disambiguation)

See also
Qara Su